Purpose + Grace is a 2011 album recorded by the English guitarist and banjo player Martin Simpson and released on the Topic Records label. The album features a mixture of traditional and original material.

Track listing
 "The Sheffield Apprentice" - 4:15
 "Bold General Wolfe" - 4:58
 "Brothers Under the Bridge" (Bruce Springsteen) - 5:14
 "Little Liza Jane" - 4:08
 "Brother Can You Spare a Dime" (Yip Harburg)- 2:50
 "Jamie Foyers" (Ewan MacColl) - 4:04
 "In The Pines" - 6:01
 "Strange Affair" (Richard Thompson) - 4:36
 "Banjo Bill" (Martin Simpson) - 3:17
 "Barbry Allen" - 6:46
 "Don't Leave Your Banjo in the Shed, Mr. Waterson" (Martin Simpson) - 1:55
 "Bad Girl's Lament" - 4:08
 "Lakes of Pontchartrain" - 5:17
All titles trad. except where noted.

Personnel
 Martin Simpson - banjo, slide guitar, lap steel guitar, guitars, vocals, production
 Andy Cutting - accordion
 BJ Cole - pedal steel guitar
 Andy Seward - bass, production, mixing
 Keith Angel - drums, percussion
 June Tabor - vocals on "Strange Affair"
 Dick Gaughan - vocals on "Jamie Foyers" and "Brother Can You Spare a Dime?"
 Fay Hield - vocals on "Bad Girl's Lament"
 Jon Boden - fiddle
 Richard Thompson - electric guitar
 Will Pound - harmonica
 Barry Phillips - cello

Martin Simpson albums
2011 albums